Swami Vivekananda in the West: New Discoveries is a series of biographical books on Swami Vivekananda written by Marie Louise Burke, who is popularly known as Sister Gargi. There are six volumes in the series. This series of books was first published in two volumes in 1957. In 1983–87, these series was republished in six volumes. The book is high acclaimed not just in India but also in the Vedanta circles around the world.

Swami Vivekananda spent a number of years (from 1893) teaching and lecturing in the West (specially in America and England). Sister Gargi researched for many years and then published her findings in these works. These books present unknown facts regarding Swami Vivekananda's life and works in America from 1893 to 1896 and, during his second visit, from 1899 to 1900.

Volumes
The six volumes provide an exhaustive account of the time Swami Vivekananda spent in the west, specially in America and Europe.

See also
 Bibliography of Swami Vivekananda

References

Swami Vivekananda
1957 non-fiction books
Indian biographies
Multi-volume biographies
Books of Hindu biography
20th-century Indian books